ČSD Class ES 499.1 is a  class of electric locomotives used primarily for passenger trains in Czech Republic and Slovakia. Now classified as Class 363, these locomotives passed to České dráhy, rail operator in the Czech Republic, and to ZSSK, rail operator in Slovakia. Class 363 is also used by ČD Cargo and ZSSK Cargo for hauling freight trains.

ES 499.1 locomotives operate both on the 3,000 V DC system and the 25 kV 50 Hz AC system.

History
In 1980 Škoda produced ES 499.1001 and 1002 as prototype locomotives for the replacement of the existing ČSD fleet. Production series locomotives started to be delivered in 1984. Two single system derivatives were also created S 499.2 (AC) and E 499.3 (DC). During 1990 further development to run at 140 km/h lead to the ČD Class 362, but an order for 30 locos was canceled due to financial problems. Some ČD Class 363 and ŽSR Class 363 locomotives are being rebuilt as 362s. Since 2011, they have also been operated with control trailers.

Power regulation
In 1980, these locomotives were the world's first multisystem locomotives with power thyristor pulse regulation. This regulation has minimal losses compared to older resistive regulation with much higher losses. This gave the locomotive its characteristic sound in three frequencies (the first is 33,3 Hz, the second is 100 Hz and the third is 300 Hz) when locomotive accelerating.

Usage
363s are currently used to haul these services 
ČD 
Prague - Břeclav
Prague - České Budějovice
Prague - Plzeň
Ústí nad Labem - Cheb
Břeclav - Petrovice u Karviné
Brno - Bohumín
Brno - Olomouc (- Šumperk)
ZSSK 
Bratislava - Žilina - Košice

Disposition

As of June 23, 2008, 12 363s remained in service with ZSSK, 23 with ZSSK Cargo, 63 with ČD and 47 with ČD Cargo.

See also
List of České dráhy locomotive classes

References

External links

Lokomotivní řada 363 ČD (ES 499.1 ČSD) in Czech
Prototypy.cz about the locomotive in Czech
VLAKY.NET forum
Czech and Slovak Railway Group in English
video of this locomotive class

25 kV AC locomotives
3000 V DC locomotives
Bo′Bo′ locomotives
Electric locomotives of Czechoslovakia
Electric locomotives of Slovakia
Electric locomotives of the Czech Republic
Railway locomotives introduced in 1980
Standard gauge locomotives of Czechoslovakia
Standard gauge locomotives of Slovakia
Standard gauge locomotives of the Czech Republic
Škoda locomotives
Bo′Bo′ electric locomotives of Europe